Events from the year 1661 in England.

Incumbents
 Monarch – Charles II
 Parliament – Cavalier (starting 8 May)

Events
 6 January – the Fifth Monarchists unsuccessfully attempt to seize control of London. George Monck's regiment defeats them.
 30 January – the bodies of Oliver Cromwell, Henry Ireton, John Bradshaw and Thomas Pride are exhumed and subjected to a posthumous execution. Oliver Cromwell's head (with the others') is placed on a spike above the Palace of Westminster.
 14 February – George Monck's regiment becomes The Lord General's Regiment of Foot Guards (which later becomes the Coldstream Guards).
 15 April – the Savoy Conference of bishops and Presbyterians fails to agree on a new revision of the Prayer Book.
 19 April – the Post Office introduces post marks.
 23 April – Charles II of England, Scotland and Ireland is crowned King in Westminster Abbey. A new St Edward's Crown is made for the occasion.
 8 May – first meeting of the Cavalier Parliament.
 5 June – Isaac Newton admitted to Trinity College, Cambridge.
 23 June – Charles II signs a marriage treaty with Portugal. He will marry Catherine of Braganza; as part of the dowry, Portugal cedes Bombay and Tangier to England and grants free trade with Brazil and the East Indies.
 28 June – Lisle's Tennis Court in Lincoln's Inn Fields, London is opened as a playhouse.
 1 October – a yacht race from Greenwich to Gravesend between King Charles and James, Duke of York makes the sport fashionable.
 October
 Collection of a "free and voluntary present" of cash for the King from householders commences.
 King Charles II appoints Peter Lely as his court painter.
 December – convocations at Canterbury and York complete the new Anglican Prayer Book (forcibly imposed in 1662).
 20 December – Parliament passes the Corporation Act 1661 restricting public office to members of the Church of England.

Publications
 Robert Boyle publishes The Sceptical Chymist in London, in which he developed the idea of elements and "corpuscles" (atoms).
 John Evelyn's pamphlet Fumifugium is one of the earliest descriptions of air pollution.

Births
 21 January – Peter Le Neve, herald and antiquary (died 1729)
 20 February – William Digby, 5th Baron Digby, politician (died 1752)
 25 February – Anne Lennard, Countess of Sussex, née Palmer or FitzRoy, illegitimate daughter of Charles II (died 1721/2)
 16 April – Charles Montagu, 1st Earl of Halifax, poet and statesman (died 1715)
 7 May – George Clarke, politician and architect (died 1736)
 11 August – William Churchill, politician (died 1737)
 31 August – Charles Granville, 2nd Earl of Bath, diplomat (died 1701)
 1 October – Sir Matthew Dudley, 2nd Baronet, Member of Parliament (died 1721)
 22 October – Margaret Holles, Duchess of Newcastle-upon-Tyne, noblewoman (d. 1717)
 28 November – Edward Hyde, 3rd Earl of Clarendon, Governor of New York and New Jersey (died 1723)
 3 December – Nathaniel Gould, politician (died 1728)
 5 December – Robert Harley, 1st Earl of Oxford and Mortimer, statesman (died 1724)
 date unknown
 Samuel Garth, physician and poet (died 1719)
 Nicholas Hawksmoor, architect (died 1736)
 Charles Paulet, 2nd Duke of Bolton, supporter of William III of Orange (died 1722)

Deaths
 19 January – Thomas Venner, Fifth Monarchist (executed) (year of birth unknown)
 1 March – Richard Zouch, jurist (born 1590)
 7 April – William Brereton, soldier and politician (born 1604)
 16 August – Thomas Fuller, churchman and historian (born 1608)
 19 November – Brian Walton, clergyman and scholar (born 1600)

References

 
Years of the 17th century in England